Rivercourse or river course may refer to:

Rivercourse, Alberta, Canada
The course of a river
The River Course, at Blackwolf Run golf complex in Kohler, Wisconsin, USA

See also
Watercourse